Lachnocnema abyssinica is a butterfly in the family Lycaenidae. It is found in Ethiopia, Eritrea, Sudan, Uganda and possibly Chad.

References

Butterflies described in 1996
Taxa named by Michel Libert
Miletinae